The Big Ten Conference Women's Basketball Defensive Player of the Year is an annual college basketball award presented to the top women's basketball defensive player in the Big Ten Conference.

Key

Winners

Winners by school

References

Awards established in 2000
Defensive Player of the Year